Juan Sebastián Gómez Iregui (born 5 March 1992) is a Colombian professional tennis player. He competes mainly on the ATP Challenger Tour and ITF Futures, both in singles and doubles. He reached his highest ATP singles ranking, No. 469 on 5 October 2015, and his highest ATP doubles ranking, No. 306, on 9 November 2015.

Summer Youth Olympics

Singles

ATP Challenger & ITF Futures

Singles: 4 (0–4)

Doubles: 10 (5–5)

Notes

References

External links

1992 births
Living people
Colombian male tennis players
Tennis players at the 2010 Summer Youth Olympics
Youth Olympic gold medalists for Colombia
Competitors at the 2010 South American Games
Sportspeople from Bogotá
20th-century Colombian people
21st-century Colombian people